The 1987 Columbia Lions football team was an American football team that represented Columbia University during the 1987 NCAA Division I-AA football season. Amid a record-setting loss streak, Columbia finished last in the Ivy League. 

In their second season under head coach Larry McElreavy, the Lions compiled an 0–10 record and were outscored 311 to 104. Mike Bissinger was the team captain.  

The Lions' winless (0–7) conference record was the worst in the Ivy League standings. Columbia was outscored 185 to 67 by Ivy opponents. 

By losing all of their games in 1987, the Lions extended a winless streak and a losing streak that began in 1983. The team would later set a Division I record for consecutive games without a win, 47. It would not win or tie another game until October 9, 1988, a win. At the end of 1987, the streak stood at 44 games without a win, and 41 straight losses.

Columbia played its homes games at Lawrence A. Wien Stadium in Upper Manhattan, in New York City.

Schedule

References

Columbia
Columbia Lions football seasons
College football winless seasons
Columbia Lions football